9001 may mean:
 AD 9001, the first year of the 10th millennium
 9001 BC, the last year of the 10th millennium BC
 9001, natural number succeeding 9000 and preceding 9002
 The standard ISO 9001
 A reference to the "It's Over 9000!" meme

See also
 90001